is  the former head coach of the Shimane Susanoo Magic in the Japanese B.League. He played college basketball for Nippon Sport Science University. He was selected by the Oita Heat Devils with the 10th overall pick in the 2005 bj League draft.

Power harassment
B.League suspended Suzuki for two months on January 21, 2020. For his power harassment to an assistant and a player, he is not allowed to coach.

Career statistics

Regular season 

|-
| align="left" | 2005-06
| align="left" | Oita
| 39 ||   || 31.46 || .427 ||bgcolor="CFECEC"| .437 || .820 || 2.41 || 4.10 || 0.51 || 0.00 ||  8.00
|-
| align="left" | 2006-07
| align="left" | Oita
| 34 ||   || 33.03 || .400 || .337 || .780 || 1.74 || 3.53 || 0.62 || 0.00 || 9.41
|-
| align="left" | 2007-08
| align="left" | Oita
| 35 ||   || 30.80 || .425 ||bgcolor="CFECEC"| .504 || .776 || 1.69 || 3.20 || 0.49 || 0.00 || 9.69 
|-
| align="left" | 2008-09
| align="left" | Oita
| 48 || 38 || 28.31 || .401 || .369 || .705 || 2.33 || 3.52 || 0.65 || 0.02 ||  5.90
|-
| align="left" | 2009-10
| align="left" | Oita
| 52 ||  || 23.06 || .431 || .344 || .778 || 1.65 || 1.88 || 0.52 || 0.00 ||5.69
|-
| align="left" | 2010-11
| align="left" | Oita
| 48 || 19 || 13.77 || .360 || .268 || .778 || 0.79 || 0.81 || 0.15 || 0.00 ||  2.46
|-
| align="left" | Career
| align="left" | 
| 256 ||   ||   ||   ||   ||   ||   ||   ||   ||   || 
|-

Head coaching record

|-
| style="text-align:left;"|Oita Heat Devils
| style="text-align:left;"|2011-12
| 52||23||29|||| style="text-align:center;"|7th in Western|||-||-||-||
| style="text-align:center;"|-
|-
| style="text-align:left;"|Oita Heat Devils
| style="text-align:left;"|2012-13
| 52||21||31|||| style="text-align:center;"|8th in Western|||-||-||-||
| style="text-align:center;"|-
|-
| style="text-align:left;"|Oita Heat Devils
| style="text-align:left;"|2013-14
| 52||20||32|||| style="text-align:center;"|8th in Western|||-||-||-||
| style="text-align:center;"|-
|-
| style="text-align:left;"|Oita Heat Devils
| style="text-align:left;"|2014-15
| 52||18||34|||| style="text-align:center;"|7th in Western|||3||1||2||
| style="text-align:center;"|Lost in 1st round
|-
| style="text-align:left;"|Kanazawa Samuraiz
| style="text-align:left;"|2015-16
| 50||27||23|||| style="text-align:center;"|7th in Western|||2||0||2||
| style="text-align:center;"|Lost in 1st round
|-
| style="text-align:left;"|Kanazawa Samuraiz
| style="text-align:left;"|2016-17
| 42||36||6|||| style="text-align:center;"|1st in B3|||10||8||2||
| style="text-align:center;"|2nd in Final stage
|-
| style="text-align:left;"|Shimane Susanoo Magic
|style="background-color:#FFCCCC" "text-align:left;"|2017-18
| 60||11||49|||| style="text-align:center;"|6th in Western|||-||-||-||
| style="text-align:center;"|relegated to B2
|-
| style="text-align:left;"|Shimane Susanoo Magic
| style="text-align:left;"|2018-19
| 60||43||17|||| style="text-align:center;"|2nd in B2 Western|||4||2||2||
| style="text-align:center;"|promoted to B1
|-
| style="text-align:left;"|Shimane Susanoo Magic
| style="text-align:left;"|2019-20
| 29||10||19|||| style="text-align:center;"|-|||-||-||-||
| -
|-

References

1977 births
Living people
Ehime Orange Vikings coaches
Ehime Orange Vikings players
Japanese basketball coaches
Kanazawa Samuraiz coaches
Niigata Albirex BB players 
Shimane Susanoo Magic coaches